The Slovak Spectator is an English-language newspaper published in Slovakia.

History and profile
The debut issue of The Slovak Spectator hit newsstands across Slovakia on 1 March 1995.

The newspaper was founded by four Americans: Rick Zednik, Richard Lewis, Eric Koomen and Daniel J. Stoll. Currently, only Koomen and Stoll are owners along with the largest media company in Slovakia, Petit Press, which also owns SME, Új Szó, Korzár and various regional My noviny newspapers.

The Slovak Spectator is published by The Rock, s.r.o. publishing house and covers local news, culture and business. The company also publishes four special publications that appear throughout the year, including the Spectacular Slovakia travel guide, the Book of Lists business directory, and comprehensive guides to local real estate, investment environment and human resources.

Its target audience consists of foreigners living and working in Slovakia, Slovaks with good command of English, students at universities, foreign companies established in Slovakia and embassies as well as similar groups living abroad, especially people who are living and working in Slovakia or who are preparing to do so.

References

External links
 

1995 establishments in Slovakia
English-language newspapers published in Europe
Newspapers established in 1995
Newspapers published in Slovakia
Weekly newspapers